MEDUSA (Mob Excess Deterrent Using Silent Audio) is a directed-energy non-lethal weapon designed by WaveBand Corporation in 2003-2004 for temporary personnel incapacitation. The weapon is based on the microwave auditory effect resulting in a strong sound sensation in the human head when it is subject to certain kinds of pulsed/modulated microwave radiation. The developers claimed that through the combination of pulse parameters and pulse power, it is possible to raise the auditory sensation to a “discomfort” level, deterring personnel from entering a protected perimeter or, if necessary, temporarily incapacitating particular individuals. In 2005, Sierra Nevada Corporation acquired WaveBand Corporation.

See also 
 Sonic weaponry

References 

Neuroscience
Non-lethal weapons